Silius is a town and comune in the province of South Sardinia, Sardinia, Italy. In 2001 it had a population of 1,384.

References 

Municipalities of the Province of South Sardinia